This article lists diplomatic missions resident in Luxembourg. At present, the capital city of Luxembourg City hosts 22 embassies. 

Several other countries have non-resident embassies accredited from other capitals, in particular Brussels and Paris, for diplomatic and consular purposes.

Embassies in Luxembourg City

Gallery

Accredited embassies 
Resident in Brussels unless otherwise noted.

 (The Hague)

 
 (The Hague)

 (The Hague)

 (Berlin)

 (The Hague)

 (New York)

 (London)

 (The Hague)

 (New York)

 (Berlin)

 (The Hague)
 (The Hague)

 (London)

 (London)

 (Stockholm)

 (London)

 (New York)

Non-resident representative offices 
Resident in Brussels:
 (Representative Office)
 (General Delegation)

Former embassies

See also 
 Foreign relations of Luxembourg
 List of diplomatic missions of Luxembourg 
 Visa requirements for Luxembourgish citizens

Notes

References

External links 
 Embassies and consulates in Luxembourg

 
Luxembourg
Diplomatic missions